Zoran Stevanović may refer to:

 Zoran Stevanović (journalist) (born 1964), journalist. television producer and executive
 Zoran Stevanović (basketball) (born 1970), Serbian basketball player